"She's Gonna Win" is a song by Bilbo. It was released as a single in 1978, and reached No. 42 on the UK Singles Chart.

References

1978 singles
1978 songs
Lightning Records singles